A cricket team representing the East African countries of Kenya, Tanzania and Uganda toured England in the 1972 season as part of a drive to encourage the development of cricket in that part of Africa.

The 1972 touring team played 18 matches. Their opponents included the Marylebone Cricket Club and many first-class county teams, although none of the matches had first-class status. The tour helped East Africa to be invited to participate at the 1975 Cricket World Cup where they achieved temporary One Day International status.

Team

Tour matches
The following matches were played during the tour:

Leading players
Kenyan Charanjive Sharma was the most consistent batsman, scoring 725 runs in 24 innings. Harilal Shah scored 680 runs in 23 innings and took 22 wickets in 159 overs. Zulfiqar Ahmed took 49 wickets for 308 runs. Jawahir Shah played several good innings and captained the side well.

References

East Africa in international cricket
International cricket competitions from 1970–71 to 1975